The discography of the Japanese singer/songwriter Yōko Oginome consists of seventeen studio albums, nine compilation albums, and forty one singles released since 1984.

Albums

Studio albums

Extended plays

Cover albums

Compilations

Box sets

Remix albums

Collaborations

Singles

Other recordings 
As a member of Milk

As a featured artist

Videography

Music video albums

Live video albums

Footnotes

References

External links 
 

Discography
Discographies of Japanese artists
Pop music discographies